Encounter at the Elbe (in ) is a Soviet war film released in 1949 from Mosfilm, describing the conflict, spying, and collaboration between the Soviet Army advancing from the east and the U.S. Army advancing from the west. The two allied forces met each other for the first time on the River Elbe near the end of the World War II. This meeting occurred on April 25, 1945, which was usually remembered as “Elbe Day” in Western Bloc nations and as the "Encounter at the Elbe” in Eastern Bloc nations.

Cast
Vladlen Davydov – Major (later Colonel) Kuzmin, Soviet military commander
Konstantin Nassonov – Maslov, military council member
Boris Andreyev – Sergeant Yegorkin
Lyubov Orlova – Journalist Janet Sherwood, an American agent
Mikhail Nazvanov – Gen. James Hill
Ivan Lyubeznov – Sergeant Harry Perebeynoga
Vladimir Vladislavsky – General McDermot
Faina Ranevskaya – Mrs. McDermot
Andrei Petrov – Soviet officer
Andrei Fajt – Nazi Schrank, hiding under the name of anti-fascist Krause
Yuri Yurovsky – Professor Otto Dietrich
Gennady Yudin – Kurt Dietrich
Erast Garin – Captain Tommy
Sergei Tsenin – Senator Woody
Viktor Kulakov – Ernst Shmetau
Lidiya Sukharevskaya – Elsa Shmetau
Nikolai Nikitich – Schultz
Rina Zelyonaya – female German with a bicycle
Harijs Avens – American
Yevgeny Kaluzhsky – General at the Embassy (uncredited)
Mikhail Vorobyov – episode (uncredited)

See also
 Second World War
 Eastern Front (World War II)
 Elbe Day

References

External links

1949 films
Films directed by Grigori Aleksandrov
Aftermath of World War II
Films scored by Dmitri Shostakovich
Soviet black-and-white films
Soviet war films
1940s war films
Soviet World War II films
Films set in 1945
Russian World War II films
1940s Russian-language films